Dargan is a surname. Notable people with the surname include:

Ash Dargan, indigenous Australian didgeridoo player
Edmund Strother Dargan, U.S. and Confederate representative from Alabama
George W. Dargan, U.S. representative from South Carolina
Karl Dargan, American amateur boxer
Michael Dargan, Irish cricketer
Olive Tilford Dargan, American author
William Dargan, Irish engineer 
Sachin Dargan, Indian Government official